The Rumble in the Jungle was a historic boxing event in Kinshasa, Zaire (now Democratic Republic of the Congo), on October 30, 1974

Rumble in the Jungle may also refer to: 
 Rumble in the Jungle (compilation album), a 2007 compilation album released by Soul Jazz Records
 Rumble in the Jungle (DJ Maphorisa, Kabza De Small and Tresor album), a 2021 collaborative album by TRESOR, DJ Maphorisa and Kabza De Small
 Rumble in the Jungle (song), a song recorded for the 1996 documentary film When We Were Kings